Christopher J. Newton (November 13, 1969 – May 24, 2007) was an American murderer executed in the state of Ohio in 2007.

Christopher Newton received the death penalty for the 2001 aggravated murder of his cellmate, Jason Brewer. At the time of the murder, Newton was imprisoned for attempted aggravated burglary of his father's home, an offense he committed a few weeks after his release from prison for a prior attempted aggravated burglary. Newton killed Brewer in their cell by stomping on his neck and head and strangling him with a strip of cloth.  According to the opinion of the Ohio Supreme Court affirming the death penalty, Newton laughed while responding officials tried to resuscitate Brewer, having smeared Brewer's blood on his face and drunk some of it (stating, "if he is not dead, I hope he is going to be a vegetable"). Newton admitted that another inmate had hired him to assault Brewer, and that he was ready to die in prison and knew that murdering another inmate would warrant a death sentence.

According to the Ohio Supreme Court, numerous psychiatrists and psychologists had examined Newton over the years, resulting in various diagnoses.  At the capital trial, a defense psychologist testified that Newton had several mental health disorders, including "mood disorder" and symptoms of post-traumatic stress disorder (PTSD).  In response, a government psychiatrist reviewed the mental health history and rebutted the defense expert.  The court denied defense funds for neuropsychiatric tests to explore other types of mental disability.  The trial was before a three-court panel of judges who, after hearing the evidence, imposed the death penalty.

A controversy arose regarding the delay in Newton's execution, as at the time , which made administration of the injections difficult. It took over two hours and 10 attempts before the execution was completed. The problems with Newton's execution occurred just over one year after the 90 minute execution of fellow Ohio inmate, Joseph Lewis Clark.

See also 
 Capital punishment in Ohio
 Capital punishment in the United States
 List of people executed in Ohio
 List of people executed in the United States in 2007

References

General references
http://www.sanduskyregister.com/articles/2007/05/24/front/289501.txt
https://web.archive.org/web/20070927174320/http://www.supremecourtofohio.gov/Communications_Office/summaries/2006/0125/030565.asp
http://ohiodeathpenaltyinfo.typepad.com/ohio_death_penalty_inform/files/NewtonOSCTbrief.doc
Death Penalty Appeal - Detail. Attorney General - State of Ohio. Retrieved on 2007-11-15.
Christopher J. Newton. The Clark County Prosecuting Attorney. Retrieved on 2007-11-15.

1969 births
2007 deaths
American people executed for murder
Executed people from Ohio
People from Ashland County, Ohio
21st-century executions by Ohio
People convicted of murder by Ohio
21st-century executions of American people
People executed by Ohio by lethal injection